Giovanni Magenta (1565–1635) was an Italian architect. He designed the cathedral of San Pietro at Bologna (1605). It was later modified by Alfonso Torreggiani (1765). He designed the church of San Salvatore in Bologna (1605–1623) and San Paolo (begun 1606).

Leonardo's journals
Leonardo da Vinci's notebooks were entrusted to his pupil and heir Francesco Melzi after Leonardo's death for publication. After Melzi's death in 1570, the collection passed to his son, the lawyer Orazio, who initially took little interest in the journals. In 1587, a Melzi household tutor named Lelio Gavardi took 13 of the manuscripts to Florence, intending to offer them to the grand duke of Tuscany. However, following Francesco I de' Medici's untimely death, Gavardi took them to Pisa to give to his relative Aldus Manutius the Younger; there, Magenta reproached Gavardi for having taken the manuscripts illicitly. Gavardi acknowledged his fault and asked Magenta, who had finished his studies and was going home to Milan, to return them to Orazio. Having many more such works in his possession, Orazio gifted the 13 volumes to Magenta. When news spread of these lost works of Leonardo's, Orazio retrieved seven of the 13 manuscripts from Magenta's brother, and gave them to Pompeo Leoni for publication in two volumes; one of these was the Codex Atlanticus.

References

Further reading

1565 births
1635 deaths
17th-century Italian architects
Italian Baroque architects
Architects from Bologna